Propaganda Due (P2) was a Masonic lodge under the Grand Orient of Italy, founded in 1877. Its Masonic charter was withdrawn in 1976, and it transformed into a criminal, clandestine, anti-communist, anti-Soviet, anti-leftist, pseudo-Masonic, and radical right organization operating in contravention of Article 18 of the Constitution of Italy that banned secret associations. In its latter period, during which the lodge was headed by Licio Gelli, P2 was implicated in numerous Italian crimes and mysteries, including the collapse of the Holy See-affiliated Banco Ambrosiano, the murders of journalist Mino Pecorelli and banker Roberto Calvi, and corruption cases within the nationwide bribe scandal Tangentopoli. P2 came to light through the investigations into the collapse of Michele Sindona's financial empire.

P2 was sometimes referred to as a "state within a state" or a "shadow government".  The lodge had among its members prominent journalists, members of parliament, industrialists, and military leaders—including Silvio Berlusconi, who later became Prime Minister of Italy; the Savoy pretender to the Italian throne Victor Emmanuel; and the heads of all three Italian intelligence services (at the time SISDE, SISMI, and CESIS). When searching Gelli's villa in 1982, police found a document entitled "Plan for Democratic Rebirth", which called for a consolidation of the media, suppression of trade unions, and the rewriting of the Italian constitution.

Outside Italy, P2 was also active in Venezuela, Uruguay, Brazil, and Argentina. Among its Argentine members were Raúl Alberto Lastiri, who was briefly interim president of the country after the end of the self-styled "Argentine Revolution" dictatorship (1966–1973); Emilio Massera, who was part of the military junta led by Jorge Rafael Videla during Argentina's last-civil military dictatorship (1976–1983);the Peronist orthodox José López Rega, who was Minister of Social Welfare (1973–1975) and founder of the paramilitary organisation Argentine Anticommunist Alliance (AAA); and General and convicted murderer Guillermo Suárez Mason.

Foundation

Propaganda was founded in 1877, in Turin, as Propaganda Massonica. This lodge was frequented by politicians and government officials from across Italy who were unable to attend their own lodges and included prominent members of the Piedmont nobility. During its history, the lodge included important Italian figures, such as the poet Giosuè Carducci, politicians Francesco Crispi and Arturo Labriola and journalist Gabriele Galantara. Propaganda Massonica was banned in 1925, alongside all other Masonic lodges and secret societies, by the Fascist regime.

Following the end of World War II, Freemasonry became legal again and the lodge was reformed. The name was changed to Propaganda Due when the Grand Orient of Italy numbered its lodges. By the 1960s, the lodge was all but inactive, holding few meetings. This original lodge had little to do with the one Licio Gelli established in 1966, two years after becoming a freemason.

During the Cold War, Italian Freemasonry traditions of free-thinking under the Risorgimento transformed into fervent anti-communism. The increasing influence of the political left at the end of the 1960s had the Masons of Italy deeply worried. In 1971, Grand Master Lino Salvini of the Grand Orient of Italy—one of Italy's largest Masonic lodges—assigned to Gelli the task of reorganizing the lodge.

Gelli took a list of "sleeping members"—members not invited to participate in Masonic rituals anymore, as Italian Freemasonry was under close scrutiny by Christian Democracy (DC) in power through the Pentapartito. From these initial connections, Gelli was able to extend his network throughout the echelons of the Italian establishment.

In 1967 Giovanni Allavena, former number one of SIFAR, was initiated into the lodge, who gave Gelli the photocopies of 157,000 secret files, containing telephone and environmental interceptions, photographs, correspondence and private information, including on the sex life, of as many personalities. Freemason Frank Gigliotti chose Gelli to form a parallel anti-communist government, in collaboration with the CIA in Rome.

In the fall of 1969, General Alexander Haig, supreme commander of NATO in Europe, and Henry Kissinger, security adviser to the Nixon presidency, authorized Gelli to recruit 400 Italian and NATO officers within the Lodge Propaganda 2.

Expulsion
The Grand Orient of Italy officially expelled Gelli and the P2 Lodge in 1976. In 1974 it was proposed that P2 be erased from the list of lodges by the Grand Orient of Italy, and the motion carried overwhelmingly. The following year a warrant was issued by the Grand Master for a new P2 lodge. It seems the Grand Orient in 1976 had only suspended the lodge, and not actually expelled it, on Gelli's request. Gelli was found to be active in the Grand Orient's national affairs two years later, financing the election of a new Grand Master. In 1981 a Masonic tribunal decided that the 1974 vote did mean the lodge had factually ceased to exist and that Gelli's lodge had therefore been (Masonically and politically) illegal since that time.

Discovery
The activities of the P2 lodge were discovered by prosecutors while investigating banker Michele Sindona, the collapse of his bank and his ties to the Sicilian Mafia. In March 1981, police found a list of alleged members in Gelli's house in Arezzo. It contained 962 names, among which were important state officials, important politicians and a number of military officers, including the heads of the three Italian secret services. Future Italian prime minister Silvio Berlusconi was on the list, although he had not yet entered politics at the time. Another famous member was Victor Emmanuel, the son of the last Italian king.

Prime Minister Arnaldo Forlani (whose chef de cabinet was a P2 member as well) appointed a Parliamentary Commission of Inquiry, headed by the independent DC Tina Anselmi. In May 1981, Forlani was forced to resign due to the P2 scandal, causing the fall of the Italian government.

In January 1982, the P2 lodge was definitively disbanded by the Law 25 January 1982, no. 17. In July 1982, new documents were found hidden in the false bottom of a suitcase belonging to Gelli's daughter at Fiumicino airport in Rome. The documents were entitled Memorandum sulla situazione italiana ("Memorandum on the Italian Situation") and Piano di rinascita democratica ("Plan of Democratic Rebirth"), and are seen as the political programme of P2. According to these documents, the main enemies of Italy were the Italian Communist Party (PCI) and the trade unions, particularly the Communist Italian General Confederation of Labour (CGIL). These had to be isolated and cooperation with the PCI, the second biggest party in Italy and one of the largest in Europe, which was proposed in the Historic Compromise by Aldo Moro, needed to be disrupted.

Gelli's goal was to form a new political and economic elite to lead Italy away from the danger of Communist rule. More controversially, it sought to do this by means of an authoritarian form of democracy. P2 advocated a programme of extensive political corruption: "political parties, newspapers and trade unions can be the objects of possible solicitations which could take the form of economic-financial manoeuvres. The availability of sums not exceeding 30 to 40 billion lire would seem sufficient to allow carefully chosen men, acting in good faith, to conquer key positions necessary for overall control."

P2's influence
Opinions about the importance and reach of P2 differ. Some see the P2 as a reactionary, shadow government ready to preempt a takeover of power in case of an electoral victory of the Italian Communist Party. Others think it was nothing more than a sordid association of people eager to improve their careers by making powerful and important connections. Nevertheless, P2 was implicated in numerous Italian scandals and mysteries.

Corriere della Sera takeover
In 1977 the P2 took control of the Corriere della Sera newspaper, a leading paper in Italy. At the time, the paper had encountered financial trouble and was unable to raise bank loans because its then editor, Piero Ottone, was considered hostile to the ruling Christian Democrats. Corriere's owners, the publishing house Rizzoli, struck a deal with Gelli. He provided the money with funds from the Vatican Bank directed by archbishop Paul Marcinkus. Ottone was fired and the paper's editorial line shifted to the right.

The paper published a long interview with Gelli in 1980. The interview was carried out by the television talk show host Maurizio Costanzo, who would also be exposed as a member of P2. Gelli said he was in favour of rewriting the Italian constitution towards a Gaullist presidential system. When asked what he always wanted to be, he replied: "A puppet master".

Bologna massacre

P2 members Gelli and the head of the secret service Pietro Musumeci were condemned for attempting to mislead the police investigation of the Bologna massacre on 2 August 1980, which killed 85 people and wounded more than 200.

Banco Ambrosiano scandal

P2 became the target of considerable attention in the wake of the collapse of Banco Ambrosiano (one of Milan's principal banks, owned in part by the Vatican Bank), and the suspicious 1982 death of its president Roberto Calvi in London, initially ruled a suicide but later prosecuted as a murder.  It was suspected by investigative journalists that some of the plundered funds went to P2 or to its members.

Protezione account
One of the documents found in 1981 was about a numbered bank account, the so-called "Protezione account", at the Union Bank of Switzerland in Lugano (Switzerland). It detailed the payment of US$7 million by the president of ENI, Florio Fiorini through Roberto Calvi to the Italian Socialist Party (PSI) leader Claudio Martelli on behalf of Bettino Craxi, the socialist Prime Minister from 1983 to 1987.

The full extent of the payment became clear only twelve years later, in 1993, during the mani pulite (Italian for "clean hands") investigations into political corruption. The money was allegedly a kickback on a loan which the Socialist leaders had organised to help bail out the ailing Banco Ambrosiano. Rumours that the Minister of Justice, Martelli, was connected with the account had been circulating since investigations began into the P2 plot. He always flatly denied them. Learning that formal investigations were opened, he resigned as minister.

Criminal organization

Parliamentary Commission of Inquiry 
The Parliamentary Commission of Inquiry, headed by Anselmi, concluded that the P2 lodge was a secret criminal organization. Allegations of surreptitious international relationships, mainly with Argentina (Gelli repeatedly suggested that he was a close friend of Juan Perón) and with some people suspected of affiliation with the American Central Intelligence Agency were also partly confirmed. Soon a political debate overtook the legal level of the analysis. The majority report said that P2 action resulted in "the pollution of the public life of a nation. It aimed to alter, often in decisive fashion, the correct functioning of the institutions of the country, according to a project which ... intended to undermine our democracy." A minority report by Massimo Teodori concluded that P2 was not just an abnormal outgrowth from an essentially healthy system, as upheld by the majority report, but an inherent part of the system itself.

New Italian law prohibiting "secret lodges"

Even though outlawed by Fascist dictator Benito Mussolini in 1925, Masonic institutions have been tolerated in Italy since the end of World War II and have been quite open about their activities and membership. A special law was issued that prohibited secret lodges, i.e. those whose locations and dates of meeting are secret, like Gelli's pseudo-Masonic association. The Grande Oriente d'Italia, after taking disciplinary action against members with P2 connections, distanced itself from Gelli's lodge. Other laws introduced a prohibition on membership in allegedly secret organizations for some categories of state officials (especially military officers). These laws have been recently questioned by the European Court of Human Rights. Following an action brought by a serving British naval officer, the European Court has established as precedent the illegality of any member nation attempting to ban Masonic membership for military officers, as a breach of their human rights.

Licio Gelli's list found in 1981
On 17 March 1981, a list composed by Licio Gelli was found in his country house (Villa Wanda). The list should be contemplated with some caution, as it is considered to be a combination  of P2 members and the contents of Gelli's Rolodex. Many on the list were apparently never asked if they wanted to join P2, and it is not known to what extent the list includes members who were formally initiated into the lodge. Since 1981, some of those on the list have demonstrated their distance from P2 to the satisfaction of the Italian legal system.

On 21 May 1981, the Italian government released the list. The Parliamentary Commission of Inquiry headed by Tina Anselmi considered the list reliable and genuine. It decided to publish the list in its concluding report, Relazione della Commissione parlamentare d’inchiesta sulla Loggia massonica P2.

The list contains 962 names (including Gelli's). It has been claimed that at least 1,000 names may still be secret, as the membership numbers begin with number 1,600, which suggests that the complete list has not yet been found. The list included all of the heads of the secret services, 195 officers of the different armed forces (12 generals of the Carabinieri, 5 of the financial police Guardia di Finanza, 22 of the army, 4 of the air force and 8 admirals), as well as 44 members of parliament, 3 ministers and a secretary of a political party, leading magistrates, a few prefects and heads of police, bankers and businessmen, civil servants, journalists and broadcasters. Included were a top official of the Banco di Roma, Italy's third largest bank at the time, and a former director-general of the Banca Nazionale del Lavoro (BNL), the country's largest.

Notable people on Gelli's list 

Some notable individuals include:

 General Aldo Alasia (Argentina).
 Federico Carlos Barttfeld (Argentina), ambassador of Argentina to Yugoslavia (1991–1995) and China (1998–2001), and later undersecretary of state in Néstor Kirchner's government, relieved of his functions in 2003 following allegations of involvement in the Dirty War.
 Silvio Berlusconi, businessman, future founder of the Forza Italia political party and Prime Minister of Italy.
 General Luis Betti (Argentina), Chief of the Joint Chiefs of Staff (1973–1974).
 Admiral Gino Birindelli, Commander in Chief Naval Fleet in the Italian Navy from 1969, and a member of the Chamber of Deputies for the neo-fascist Italian Social Movement (MSI) in 1972–1976.
 Roberto Calvi, known as "God's banker", chairman of Banco Ambrosiano from 1975, allegedly killed by the mafia in London in 1982.
 Vincenzo Carollo, politician of the Christian Democratic Party (DC), President of Sicily 1967–1969 and member of the Senate of the Republic 1972–1987.
 Fabrizio Cicchitto, member of the Italian Socialist Party, who later joined Berlusconi's centre-right party Forza Italia.
 Maurizio Costanzo, popular television talk show host of Mediaset programmes (Mediaset is Silvio Berlusconi's commercial television network).
 Federico Umberto D'Amato, leader of the Office for Reserved Affairs (Ufficio affari riservati), an intelligence cell in the Italian Ministry of the Interior.
  (Argentina), Secretary of State for Minors and the Family in the Ministry of Social Welfare (1973–1974), while it was headed by his friend José López Rega (see below); ambassador of Argentina to UNESCO (1974), France (1974–1975) and Denmark (1975–1976).
 Stefano Delle Chiaie,  Italian neo-fascist terrorist who had ties with Operation Condor and the regime of Luis García Meza Tejada in Bolivia.
 , director of Corriere della Sera. Di Bella had commissioned a long interview with Gelli, who openly talked of his plans for a "democratic renaissance" in Italy—including control over the media. The interview was carried out by the television talk show host Maurizio Costanzo, who would also be exposed as a member of P2 (see above).
 Franco Foschi, politician of the Christian Democratic Party (DC), Minister of Labour and Social Security (1980).
 Artemio Franchi, president of the Italian Football Federation (FIGC) (1967–1976, 1978–1980), president of UEFA (1973-1983) and member of the executive committee of FIFA (1974–1983).
 General Orazio Giannini, commander of the Guardia di Finanza (1980–1981). On the day the list was discovered, Giannini phoned the official in charge of the operation, and told him (according to the official's testimony to the parliamentary commission): "You better know that you've found some lists. I'm in those lists – be careful, because so too are all the highest echelons (I understood 'of the state'). ... Watch out, the Force will be overwhelmed by this."
 General , commander of the Guardia di Finanza (1974–1978). Appointed by Giulio Andreotti, Giudice conspired with oil magnate Bruno Musselli and others in a lucrative tax fraud of as much as $2.2 billion.
 General , head of Italy's civilian secret service SISDE (1977–1981).
 Raúl Alberto Lastiri (Argentina), interim president of Argentina from 13 July 1973 until 12 October 1973.
 Pietro Longo, secretary of the Italian Democratic Socialist Party (PSDI) (1978–1985) and Minister of Budget in Bettino Craxi's first cabinet (1983–1984).
 José López Rega (Argentina), Argentine Minister of Social Welfare under Juan Perón and Isabel Perón (1973–1975) and ambassador of Argentina to Spain (1975–1976), founder of the Argentine Anticommunist Alliance ("Triple A").
 Enrico Manca, editor of Giornale Radio Rai and Minister of Foreign Trade (1980–1981).
 Luigi Mariotti, politician of the Christian Democratic Party (DC), Minister of Health (1964–1968, 1970–1972) and Minister of Transport and Civil Aviation (1968–1969).
 Emilio Massera (Argentina), admiral and Commander-in-Chief of the Argentine Navy, and a member of the National Reorganization Process, the military junta ruling Argentina led by General Jorge Rafael Videla, in 1976–1978.
 General Vito Miceli, chief of the Operative Informations and Situation Service (Servizio Informazioni Operative e Situazione, SIOS), the Italian Army's intelligence service from 1969 and head of the military intelligence service SISMI/SID from October 18, 1970, to 1974. Arrested in 1975 on charges of "conspiracy against the state" concerning investigations about Rosa dei venti, a state-infiltrated group involved in the strategy of tension, he later became a member of the Italian Social Movement (MSI).
 General Pietro Musumeci, deputy director of SISMI.
 Umberto Ortolani, banker and businessman, closely involved with Gelli's business interests in South America and with the Vatican Bank.
 General Giovambattista Palumbo, commander of the 1st Carabinieri Division "Pastrengo".
 Carmine Pecorelli, a controversial journalist assassinated on 20 March 1979. In a May 1978 article, he had drawn connections between the kidnapping of Aldo Moro and Operation Gladio.
 Mario Pedini, politician of the Christian Democratic Party (DC), Minister of Scientific Research (1975–1978), Minister of Culture and 
 Environmental Heritage (1976–1978) and Minister of Public Education and Universities (1978–1979).
 General Franco Picchiotti, commander of the 11th Carabinieri Mechanized Brigade.
 , owner of Corriere della Sera, later a cinema producer.
  (Argentina), Argentine Minister of Economy (1975) and friend of José López Rega (see above).
 General , head of Italy's military intelligence service SISMI (1978–1981).
 Gustavo Selva, director of the Rai Radio 2 news programs, at the time of the publication of Gelli's list a Member of the European Parliament for the Christian Democratic Party (DC), later a member of the Chamber of Deputies and the Senate of the Republic for the National Alliance.
 Gaetano Stammati, President of the Italian Commercial Bank (COMIT), Minister of Finance (1976) in Aldo Moro's government, Minister of Treasury (1976–1978), Minister of Public works (1978–1979) and Minister of International Trade (1979) in Giulio Andreotti's third, fourth and fifth governments.
 General Guillermo Suárez Mason (Argentina), military officer in charge of the Batallón de Inteligencia 601 during the Dirty War and Operation Condor.
 , general director of Corriere della Sera.
 Admiral , Chief of Staff of the Italian Navy (1977–1980) and Chief of the Defence Staff (1980–1981).
  (Argentina), Argentine Minister of Foreign Affairs and Worship (1973–1975).
 Claudio Villa, famous singer and actor who represented Italy in the Eurovision Song Contest in 1962 and 1967.
 Vittorio Emanuele, Prince of Naples, son of Umberto II and disputed head of the House of Savoy.

See also
Alliance for Shared Values
Secret society
Strategy of tension

Footnotes

References

Further reading

Ginsborg, Paul (2003). Italy and Its Discontents, London: Palgrave Macmillan  (Review Institute of Historical Research | Review New York Times)
Ginsborg, Paul (2005). Silvio Berlusconi: television, power and patrimony, London: Verso, 2005 
 Herman, Edward and Frank Brodhead (1986) The Rise and Fall of the Bulgarian Connection, New York: Sheridan Square 
  (Der aufhaltsame Aufstieg der Loge P2, in the 1984 German edition)
Jones, Tobias (2003). The Dark Heart of Italy. New York: North Point Press.

Stille, Alexander (1995). Excellent Cadavers. The Mafia and the Death of the First Italian Republic, New York: Vintage 
Willan Philip P. (2002). Puppetmasters: The Political Use of Terrorism in Italy, iUniverse, 
Normand, P.G. "The Italian Dilemma". American Masonic Review, Vol. 3, No. 2. (Publ. by St. Alban's Research Society, College Station, Texas; Spring 1994.)
DeHoyos, Art & S. Brent Morris (1997). The methods of anti-Masons, Masonic Information Center.
Unger, Craig. The war they wanted, the lies they needed, Vanity Fair, July 2006.
Willan, Philip.  The Last Supper: the Mafia, the Masons and the Killing of Roberto Calvi, Constable & Robinson, 2007()
Dickie, John. Cosa Nostra: A History of the Sicilian Mafia, Palgrave Macmillan, 2004
Sterling, Claire, The Mafia: The Long Reach of the International Sicilian Mafia
Hellenga, Robert, The Fall of a Sparrow.  This is a novel about an American man whose daughter is killed in the 1980 Bologna train station bombing and his attendance at the trial in Italy of one of the bombing suspects. 
 (bibliographic index)

External links
 Article by Gianni Barbacetto
 Philip Willan, personal website of journalist and author with information on Roberto Calvi, Banco Ambrosiano, Licio Gelli, Propaganda Due.

 
Organizations established in 1877
1877 establishments in Italy
19th century in Italy
20th century in Italy
Cold War
Modern history of Italy
Far-right politics in Italy
Freemasonry in Italy
Freemasonry-related controversies
Political history of Italy
Argentina–Italy relations
Brazil–Italy relations
Secret societies related to organized crime
Terrorism in Italy
Years of Lead (Italy)
Masonic Lodges